Chambers Crossing Halt railway station was a timber-framed railway halt on the Stratford-upon-Avon to Cheltenham section of the Honeybourne Line. The station was located two miles south-west of Stratford upon Avon.

History
A single platform was built to the south of the level crossing over a lane which ran from Weston-on-Avon to Clifford Chambers. A crossing keeper's cottage had been built here in around 1899 and by the time the halt opened, the crossing was gated and protected by signals. The gates were operated by a ground frame on the west side of the line to the north of the crossing. When the line was doubled in 1908, the frame was relocated to the opposite site of the crossing, adjacent to the keeper's cottage. A second platform was added on the Up side around this time at a cost of £75.

Due to low patronage and the outbreak of the First World War, the station, along with two other halts opened on the same date ( and ) closed on 17 July 1916 as a wartime economy measure. It is thought unlikely that there are any photographs of the station in existence due to its short lifetime and its unremarkable appearance.

Freight services continued to pass through the station until November 1976 when the line itself was closed. The tracks between the current Stratford station and Honeybourne were taken up in 1979.

Present day
The crossing cottage survives as a private residence.

References

Sources

 
 

Railway stations in Great Britain opened in 1904
Railway stations in Great Britain closed in 1916
Disused railway stations in Warwickshire
Former Great Western Railway stations